Kendra Anderson (born June 27, 1957) is an American politician and a Democratic member of the Rhode Island Senate representing District 31 since January 5, 2021.

Career
Anderson is an ESOL teacher and the founder of Climate Action Rhode Island.

In 2019, Anderson, a progressive, announced that she would challenge longtime incumbent senator and judiciary committee chair Erin Lynch Prata in the Democratic primary. Lynch Prata declined to run for re-election, instead accepting an appointment to the Rhode Island Supreme Court, and Anderson won the primary and general election.

References 

Living people
Democratic Party Rhode Island state senators
21st-century American politicians
1957 births